Old Peru (also Peru, pronounced PEE-roo) is an unincorporated community in Madison County, Iowa, United States.  Its elevation is 1,122 feet (342 m).  Although Old Peru is unincorporated, it once had a post office under the name of Peru; the office was established on 18 April 1853 and closed on 14 September 1903. Even though the community's post office has been closed for over a century, ZIP Code 50222 is still reserved for Peru.

Old Peru was laid out as a town in 1855, but it declined when the railroad missed it by a mile, and in 1887 the town of East Peru was founded on that line.

The original (seedling) delicious apple tree grew in Peru.

References

Unincorporated communities in Madison County, Iowa
1855 establishments in Iowa
Unincorporated communities in Iowa